Poison Greatest Video Hits is the fifth DVD/video from the rock band Poison, released in 2001 following the success of the VH1 Behind the Music episode of the band.

Background
The DVD was released following the Poison album Power to the People and features every Poison music video up to this point including the latest video, the album titled track "Power to the People" .

Every Poison album featured music videos up to this point except for the album Crack a Smile...and More!.

The DVD consists of the first two Poison video releases "Sight for Sore Ears" which was certified Can Gold  and "Flesh, Blood, & Videotape" (which have not been released on DVD) and also features behind the scenes footage, in depth interviews, various clips and music videos from 'Swallow This Live', 'Native Tongue' and 'Power to the People' albums.

The DVD received US Gold certification in 2003.

Track listing
 Cry Tough
 I Want Action
 Talk Dirty To Me
 I Won't Forget You
 Nothin' but a Good Time
 Fallen Angel
 Every Rose Has Its Thorn
 Your Mama Don't Dance
 Unskinny Bop
 Ride the Wind
 Something To Believe In
 Life Goes On
 (Flesh & Blood) Sacrifice
 So Tell Me Why
 Stand
 Until You Suffer Some (Fire And Ice)
 Power to the People

Band members
 Bret Michaels - lead vocals
 C.C. DeVille - lead guitar (except videos 15 & 16, does not appear in video 14)
 Bobby Dall - bass 
 Rikki Rockett - drums
 Richie Kotzen - lead guitar (videos 15 & 16 only)

Certifications

References

External links
Official website
Poison Colombia
Poison Mexico

2001 video albums
Music video compilation albums
Poison (American band) video albums
2001 compilation albums